Pokiok Falls is a former waterfall in Pokiok, New Brunswick where the Pokiok Stream emptied over a ledge into the Saint John River. The high water level of the Mactaquac Dam reservoir submerged the waterfall and the Pokiok Gorge in 1967.

See also
List of waterfalls in Canada
Waterfall

References

Waterfalls of New Brunswick
Landforms of York County, New Brunswick